Miguel López may refer to:

 Miguel Ángel López (disambiguation)
 Miguel López (athlete) (born 1990), Puerto Rican sprinter
 Miguel López (film editor) (born 1945), Argentine film editor
 Miguel López (footballer, born 1949), Cuban footballer
 Miguel Lopez (soccer, born 1953), Salvadoran-American soccer defender
 Miguel Pedro López (born 1988), Argentine footballer for Quilmes
 Miguel López Rivera, Puerto Rican politician and mayor of Las Piedras
 Miguel López de Legazpi (1503-1572), Spanish governor of the Philippines